Mohammad Saleem may refer to:

 Mohammad Yunus Saleem (1912–2004), Indian politician, scholar and lawyer
 Mohammad Saleem (physicist) (1934–2016), Pakistani particle physicist
 Mohammad Saleem (cricketer) (born 2002), Afghan cricketer